Jonas Černius (6 January 1898, Kupiškis, Kovno Governorate – 3 July 1977, Los Angeles) was a Lithuanian general and Prime Minister. When Lithuania declared independence in 1918, he joined the army as a volunteer and participated in the Freedom Wars. He was one of the first graduates from the War School of Kaunas, but he continued to study military engineering in Brussels (1929) and Paris (1932).

On his return to Lithuania, he was promoted to lieutenant colonel and appointed as chief of the military technical staff. In 1934 he became a colonel. In 1935 he was promoted to brigadier general and Chief of the General Staff. From 30 March to 22 November 1939 he was the Prime Minister and led the 20th cabinet. After resigning as prime minister, he was promoted to major general and put in command of the 1st Division. Following the annexation of Lithuania by the Soviet Union, he served in the Soviet Army's 24th Rifle Corps until Nazi Germany invaded in 1941.

He fled to Germany in 1944 to avoid the second Soviet occupation in 1944. At first he lived in Germany, then England, and in 1948 moved to the U.S. He later worked as an engineer for General Motors.

References 
 
 Jonas Černius, Previous Governments: Between 1918 and 1940, Government of the Republic of Lithuania. Retrieved 7 September 2006.

1898 births
1977 deaths
People from Kupiškis
People from Vilkomirsky Uyezd
Prime Ministers of Lithuania
Lithuanian generals
Lithuanian people of World War II